The National High School Baseball Invitational Tournament (選抜高等学校野球大会 senbatsu kōtō gakkō yakyū taikai) of Japan, commonly known as "Spring Kōshien" (春の甲子園 haru no kōshien) or "Senbatsu" (センバツ), is an annual high school baseball tournament.

Background 
The tournament, organized by the Japan High School Baseball Federation and Mainichi Shimbun, takes place each year in March at Hanshin Koshien Stadium in the Koshien district of Nishinomiya, Hyōgo, Japan.

Teams qualify for the tournament by participating in the regional fall tournaments held throughout the country.  While finishing in the top teams generally guarantees an invitation, it is up to the Japan High School Baseball Federation to determine invitees.  For instance, in the 2008 Fall Tournament in the Tōhoku region, Ichinoseki Gakuin was the runner-up.  However, they were passed over for 3rd place Hanamaki Higashi for the 2009 invitation tournament.

Of the 32 bids, 26 are automatically awarded as follows to the following regions:
 Hokkaido - 1
 Tōhoku - 2
 Kantō - 4
 Tokyo - 1
 Tōkai - 2
 Hoku-shin'etsu - 2
 Kansai - 6
 Chūgoku - 2.5
 Shikoku - 2.5
 Kyushu including Okinawa - 4

In addition, one additional bid is awarded to a team in the Kanto/Tokyo region, and another to a team in the Chugoku/Shikoku region.

The region of the winning team in the Meiji Jingu Fall Tournament (which consists of all fall regional champions) also receives a bid.

The final 3 bids are what are considered "21st Century Teams".

21st century teams are a way to give teams who either may not get close to qualifying or who have served as a model school in some way a chance to compete.  A team from each prefecture is nominated around November–December.  The teams must have advanced to the round of 16 play, but not gotten past the quarterfinals of their prefecture's tournament.  Then each region nominates one of those nominees to the selection committee by December 15. Finally, the committee selects the three 21st century teams.

Finals

List of champions

See also
High school baseball in Japan
Japan High School Baseball Federation
Japanese High School Baseball Championship ("Summer Koshien")
Hanshin Koshien Stadium

High school baseball in Japan
Baseball competitions in Japan
Tourist attractions in Hyōgo Prefecture
Sport in Hyōgo Prefecture
Recurring sporting events established in 1924
1924 establishments in Japan